Zakas is a village and a community of the Grevena municipality. Before the 2011 local government reform it was a part of the municipality of Theodoros Ziakas, of which it was a municipal district. The 2011 census recorded 145 residents in the village and 157 residents in the community. The community of Zakas covers an area of 29.711 km2.

Administrative division
The community of Zakas consists of two separate settlements: 
Perivolaki (population 12)
Zakas (population 145)
The aforementioned population figures are as of 2011.

See also
 List of settlements in the Grevena regional unit

References

Populated places in Grevena (regional unit)